Khonj (also Romanized as Khanj; also known as Khownj and Khūnj) is a village in Karghond Rural District, Nimbeluk District, Qaen County, South Khorasan Province, Iran. At the 2006 census, its population was 209, in 68 families.

References 

Populated places in Qaen County